Patec is a village in the municipality of Kičevo, North Macedonia. It used to be part of the former Vraneštica Municipality.

History
Although the village is populated by an Orthodox Macedonian population, archaeological traces of "Latin graves" found in the settlement suggest the former presence of a Catholic Albanian community. The term Latini, is an archaic term used by Slavic and Aromanian Orthodox communities to refer to Catholic Albanians.

Demographics

According to the 2002 census, the village had a total of 8 inhabitants. Ethnic groups in the village include:

Macedonians 8

References

Villages in Kičevo Municipality